Wangdian (王店) may refer to the following locations in China:

Towns 
 Wangdian, Anhui, Yingzhou District, Fuyang
 Wangdian, Neixiang County, Henan
 Wangdian, Dangyang, Hubei
 Wangdian, Xiaochang County, Hubei
 Wangdian, Tibet
 Wangdian, Zhejiang, Xiuzhou District, Jiaxing

Townships 
 Wangdian Township, Biyang County, Henan
 Wangdian Township, Huaibin County, Henan
 Wangdian Township, Huaiyang County, Henan
 Wangdian Township, Jiangsu, in Xuyi County